Aphidomorpha is an infraorder within the insect order Sternorrhyncha which includes the aphids and their allies in the superfamilies Adelgoidea, Phylloxeroidea and Aphidoidea. This group also includes numerous fossil taxa of uncertain placement, such as these other superfamilies Triassoaphidoidea  ,  Genaphidoidea,  Palaeoaphidoidea, and  Tajmyraphidoidea.

The treatment of the members in the group varies and the following variant treatments of the extant families can be found in literature.

References

External links 
 Aphid species file

Sternorrhyncha